Frazier High School is a rural, public high school. It is the sole high school in the Frazier School District. It is in northern Fayette County, Pennsylvania, in the town of Perryopolis. In the 2015–2016 school year, enrollment was reported as 340 pupils in 9th through 12th grades.

Frazier High School was established in 1966, and resulted in the consolidation of the Perry and Lower Tyrone School Districts. The school was last renovated in 1990, when space was reconfigured for the addition of the Frazier Middle School, the high school's sole feeder. The name comes from Mary Fuller Frazier, a wealthy resident who gave an endowment to the district for the improvement of the school system.

The Intermediate Unit IU1 provides the school and the district with a wide variety of services like specialized education for disabled students and hearing, background checks for employees, state mandated recognizing and reporting child abuse training, speech and visual disability services and criminal background check processing for prospective employees and professional development for staff and faculty.

Extracurriculars
Frazier School District offers a wide variety of clubs, activities and an extensive sports program. The National Honor Society Chapter is active in the school.

Athletics

The Frazier High School Football team has made the WPIAL playoffs for the 2011, 2012, 2013, and 2014 seasons. Also the Frazier Boys' and Girls' Basketball teams made the WPIAL playoffs for the 2012 season.  The Girls' Volleyball team have been section champions for the past 4 years, and the WPIAL champions in 2008.  In addition, the Frazier Boys' Varsity Cross Country team won the section title for the 2010 and 2011 seasons.  The Cross Country team placed within the top 10 teams at the WPIAL championship in 2011, and sent 2 runners to the PIAA state championship the same year.

References

Schools in Fayette County, Pennsylvania
Public high schools in Pennsylvania
Educational institutions established in 1966
1966 establishments in Pennsylvania